The Zakopane-Gubałówka transmitter (Polish designation: RTON Gubałówka) is a facility for FM- and TV-transmission on the Gubałówka mountain at Zakopane, Poland. It is situated at 1,122 metres above sea level.

Transmitted programs

Radio

Digital TV (MPEG-4)

External links

 http://ukf.pl/index.php/topic,64.0.html
 http://www.duntek.hg.pl/gubalowka.htm
 http://skyscraperpage.com/diagrams/?b60714
 http://radiopolska.pl/wykaz/pokaz_lokalizacja.php?pid=40

Towers in Poland
Tatra County
Buildings and structures in Lesser Poland Voivodeship